A Step into the Dark is a 2014 Slovak drama film directed by Miloslav Luther. It was selected as the Slovak entry for the Best Foreign Language Film at the 87th Academy Awards, but was not nominated.

Cast
 Marko Igonda
 Kristýna Boková
 Miroslav Donutil
 Boris Farkas
 Marián Geišberg
 Monika Haasová
 Vladimír Hajdu
 Lucia Jasková
 Attila Mokos
 Peter Nádasdi

See also
 List of submissions to the 87th Academy Awards for Best Foreign Language Film
 List of Slovak submissions for the Academy Award for Best Foreign Language Film

References

External links
 

2014 films
2014 drama films
Slovak-language films
Slovak drama films